Li Yuchun, also known as Chris Lee, is a Chinese singer and songwriter. She has won hundreds of awards and accolades from music, fashion, entertainment, film, and advertisement.

Abbey Road Music Awards 
The Abbey Road Music Awards (Chinese: 阿比鹿音乐奖) were created by the Chinese website Douban in 2011. Lee has been awarded once in 2015.

!
|-
|2010
|A Magical Encounter 1987 (Chinese: 1987我不知会遇见你)
|Best Single: Pop (Chinese: 最受欢迎流行单曲)
|
|rowspan="1" style="text-align:center;"|

Asia Music Gala 2016 
The Asia Music Gala were presented by China internet company Tencent and MTV in 2016. Lee has won 2 awards.

!
|-
!scope="row" rowspan="2"|2016
|Chris Lee
|Mainland Best Female (Chinese:内地最佳女歌手)
|
|rowspan="2" style="text-align:center;"|
|-
|Barbaric growth (Chinese:野蛮生长)
|Mainland Best Album (Chinese:内地年度最佳唱片大赏)
|

Asian Film Awards 
The Asian Film Awards are presented annually by the Hong Kong International Film Festival Society to recognize the excellence of the film professionals in the film industries of Asian cinema. Lee has been nominated once for her role in Bodyguards and Assassins.

!
|-
|2010
|Bodyguards and Assassins
|Best Newcomer (Chinese: 最佳新演员)
|
|rowspan="1" style="text-align:center;"|

Asia Song Festival 
Asia Song Festival, a.k.a. A-Song-Fe or ASF, is an annual Asian pop music festival held in South Korea, since 2004. It is hosted by the Korea Foundation for International Culture Exchange (KOFICE) and features artists from Asian countries.

!
|-
|2009
|Chris Lee
|Best Asian Artist: Mainland China
|
|

Baidu Entertainment Boiling Point 
As the biggest Chinese search engine, Baidu honors the most popular people and events based on the company's database. 

!
|-
|2008
|Chris Lee
|Most Influential Singer (Chinese: 年度最具号召力歌手)
|
|
|-
!scope="row" rowspan="2"|2009
|Teenage China (Chinese:少年中国)
|Hottest Music Video (Chinese: 最热门音乐录影带)
|
|
|-
|Chris Lee
|Most Searched Idol (Chinese: 最人气偶像(搜索160,816,303次))
|
|

Beijing Pop Music Awards 

!
|-
!scope="row" rowspan="3"|2007
!scope="row" rowspan="2"|Chris Lee
|Favorite Female Singer (Mainland) (Chinese: 内地年度最受欢迎女歌手)
|
|rowspan="3" style="text-align:center;"|
|-
|Favorite Female New Singer (Chinese: 年度最受欢迎女新人)
|
|-
|Loving
|Golden Melodies of the Year (Chinese: 年度金曲)
|
|-
!scope="row" rowspan="5"|2008
!scope="row" rowspan="3"|Chris Lee
|Favorite Female Singer (Mainland) (Chinese: 内地年度最受欢迎女歌手)
|
|rowspan="1" style="text-align:center;"|
|-
|Best Female Singer (Mainland) (Chinese: 内地年度最佳女歌手)
|
|rowspan="1" style="text-align:center;"|
|-
|Best Stage Performance Female (Chinese: 年度最佳舞台演绎女歌手)
|
|rowspan="1" style="text-align:center;"|
|-
|Floated Subway (Chinese: 漂浮地铁)
!scope="row" rowspan="2"|Golden melodies of the Year (Chinese: 年度金曲)
|
|rowspan="2" style="text-align:center;"|
|-
|Interior Student (Chinese: 差生)
|
|-
!scope="row" rowspan="3"|2009
!scope="row" rowspan="5"|Chris Lee
|Best Female Singer (Mainland) (Chinese:内地年度最佳女歌手)
|
|rowspan="3" style="text-align:center;"|
|-
|Favorite Female Singer (Mainland) (Chinese: 内地年度最受欢迎女歌手)
|
|-
|Best Stage Performance Female (Chinese: 年度最佳舞台演绎女歌手)
|
|-
!scope="row" rowspan="5"|2010
|Best Female Singer (Mainland) (Chinese: 内地年度最佳女歌手)
|
|rowspan="2" style="text-align:center;"|
|-
|Favorite Female Singer (Mainland) (Chinese: 年度最受欢迎女歌手)
|
|-
|Why Me
|Golden Melodies of the Year (Chinese: 年度金曲)
|
|rowspan="3" style="text-align:center;"|
|-
!scope="row" rowspan="5"|Chris Lee
|Best Stage Performance Female (Chinese: 年度最佳舞台演绎女歌手)
|
|-
|All-round  Artist (Mainland) (Chinese: 内地年度全能艺人)
|
|-
!scope="row" rowspan="5"|2011
|Favorite Female Singer (Mainland) (Chinese: 年度最受欢迎女歌手)
|
|rowspan="2" style="text-align:center;"|
|-
|Best Stage Performance Female (Chinese: 年度最佳舞台演绎女歌手)
|
|-
|Best Female Singer (Mainland) (Chinese: 内地年度最佳女歌手)
|
|rowspan="2" style="text-align:center;"|
|-
!scope="row" rowspan="2"|See You Next Crossing (Chinese: 下个，路口，见)
|Best Composing (Chinese: 年度最佳作曲)
|
|-
|Golden Melodies of the Year (Chinese: 年度金曲)
|
|
|-
!scope="row" rowspan="6"|2012
!scope="row" rowspan="3"|Chris Lee
|Favorite Female Singer (Mainland) (Chinese: 年度最受欢迎女歌手)
|
|rowspan="4" style="text-align:center;"|
|-
|Best Stage Performance Female (Chinese: 年度最佳舞台演绎女歌手)
|
|-
|All-round  Artist (Mainland) (Chinese: 内地年度全能艺人)
|
|-
|Sorry, Just Miss You Suddenly (Chinese: 对不起只是忽然很想你)
|Golden Melodies of the Year (Chinese: 年度金曲)
|
|-
|Chris Lee/The Dancing Artist (Chinese: 会跳舞的文艺青年)
|Best Composing (Chinese: 年度最佳作曲)
|
|rowspan="2" style="text-align:center;"|
|-
|Chris Lee
|Best Female Singer (Mainland) (Chinese: 内地年度最佳女歌手)
|
|-
!scope="row" rowspan="7"|2013
|Chris Lee/Old If Not Wild (Chinese: 再不疯狂我们就老了)
|Best Lyric (Chinese: 年度最佳作词)
|
|rowspan="4" style="text-align:center;"|
|-
|Old If Not Wild (Chinese: 再不疯狂我们就老了)
|Best Album (Chinese: 年度最佳专辑)
|
|-
!scope="row" rowspan="2"|Chris Lee
|Best Stage Performance Female (Chinese: 年度最佳舞台演绎女歌手)
|
|-
|Favorite Female Singer (Mainland) (Chinese: 年度最受欢迎女歌手)
|
|-
|Chris Lee/Old If Not Wild (Chinese: 再不疯狂我们就老了)
|Best Composing (Chinese: 年度最佳作曲)
|
|rowspan="3" style="text-align:center;"|
|-
!scope="row" rowspan="2"|Chris Lee
|Best Female Singer (Mainland) (Chinese: 内地年度最佳女歌手)
|
|-
|Best Songwriter (Mainland) (Chinese: 年度最佳创作歌手奖(内地))
|

BQ Weekly Awards 
BQ Weekly Awards (Chinese: BQ红人榜) were created by a Beijing magazine BQ Weekly in 2006, honoring people in multiple fields.

!
|-
!scope="row" rowspan="2"|2008
|Chris Lee
|Female Singer of the Year (Chinese: 年度女歌手)
|
|rowspan="2" style="text-align:center;"|
|-
|Teenage China (Chinese: 少年中国)
|Song of the Year (Chinese: 年度金曲)
|
|-
|2013
|Chris Lee
|Hottest Musician (Chinese: 年度音乐红人)
|
|rowspan="1" style="text-align:center;"|

China Gold Record Awards 

!
|-
|2010
|Chris Lee
|Best Pop Female (Chinese: 流行类最佳女歌手)
|
|

China Music Awards 
The China Music Awards (Chinese: 全球华语音乐榜中榜颁奖典礼), also known as CMA, is a Chinese music awards show, established by Channel [V] in 1994. Lee has won 11 times in music. The CMAs once expanded their categories into TV and movie fields during 2010–2012, and Lee was nominated once for her role in Bodyguards and Assassins.

!
|-
!scope="row" rowspan="4"|2010
!scope="row" rowspan="3"|Chris Lee
|Most Popular Female Singer (Mainland) (Chinese: 内地最受欢迎女歌手)
|
|rowspan="3" style="text-align:center;"|
|-
|Favorite Chendu Act (Chinese: 年度最受欢迎成都艺人)
|
|-
|12530 MIGU Music Award (Chinese： 12530无线音乐年度大奖)
|
|-
|Bodyguards and Assassins
|Best Newcomer (Chinese: 最佳新演员)
|
|rowspan="1" style="text-align:center;"|
|-
|2011
!scope="row" rowspan="3"|Chris Lee
|Most Popular Female Singer (Mainland) (Chinese: 内地最受欢迎女歌手)
|
|
|-
!scope="row" rowspan="2"|2012
|Best Female Singer (Mainland) (Chinese: 内地最佳女歌手)
|
|rowspan="1" style="text-align:center;"|
|-
|Most Popular Female Singer (Mainland) (Chinese: 内地最受欢迎女歌手)
|
|rowspan="1" style="text-align:center;"|
|-
!scope="row" rowspan="4"|2013
|Old If Not Wild (Chinese: 再不疯狂我们就老了)
|Best Album (Mainland) (Chinese: 内地年度最佳专辑)
|
|rowspan="3" style="text-align:center;"|
|-
|Chris Lee
|Most Popular Female Singer (Mainland) (Chinese: 内地最受欢迎女歌手)
|
|-
!scope="row" rowspan="2"|Cold Blade (Chinese: 刀锋偏冷)
|Top Hits (Chinese: 榜中榜金曲)
|
|-
|Best Music Video (Chinese: 最佳音乐录影带)
|
|rowspan="1" style="text-align:center;"|
|-
!scope="row" rowspan="2"|2014
!scope="row" rowspan="2"|Chris Lee
|Best Female Singer (Mainland) (Chinese: 内地最佳女歌手)
|
|rowspan="2" style="text-align:center;"|
|-
|Asian Most Influential Chinese Singer (Chinese: 亚洲影响力最佳歌手)
|

Chinese Music Awards 
The Chinese Music Awards (Chinese: 华语金曲奖) is an accolade founded in 2008 to recognize outstanding achievement in the Chinese music industry.

!
|-
|2014
|Old If Not Wild (Chinese: 再不疯狂我们就老了)
|Top 10 Mandarin songs (Chinese: 十大华语金曲)
|
|

Chinese Music Media Awards 

!
|-
|2006
|Chris Lee
|Artist of the Year (Chinese: 年度艺人)
|
|

Chinese Film Media Awards 

!
|-
|2010
|Bodyguards and Assassins
|Best Newcomer (Chinese:最佳新演员)
|
|

CSC Music Awards 
City Super Chart (CSC) Awards (Chinese: 城市至尊音乐盛典) is a music ceremony presented by CityFM, featuring a radio music chart with that same title since 2007.

!
|-
!scope="row" rowspan="2"|2013
|Chris Lee-Young (Chinese: 似火年华)
|Favorite Female Singer (Chinese: 年度听众最爱女歌手)
|
|rowspan="2" style="text-align:center;"|
|-
|Old If Not Wild (Chinese: 再不疯狂我们就老了)
|Top 20 Hits (年度二十大金曲)
|
|-
!scope="row" rowspan="4"|2015
!scope="row" rowspan="3"|A Magical Encounter 1987 (Chinese: 1987我不知会遇见你)
|Long Live Single (Chinese: 年度最长寿单曲)
|
|rowspan="2" style="text-align:center;"|
|-
|Top 20 Hits (年度二十大金曲)
|
|-
|Favorite Single (Chinese: 年度听众最爱单曲)
|
|rowspan="2" style="text-align:center;"|
|-
|Chris Lee-This Unfeeling World (Chinese: 冷暖)
|Favorite Female Singer (Chinese: 年度听众最爱女歌手)
|

Entertainment Awards 
Created by Enlight Media in 2007, the awards ceremony (Chinese: 娱乐大典) was to honor people in movies, television, music, brands and top web figures, etc.

!
|-
!scope="row" rowspan="3"|2007
|Empress and Her Dream (Chinese: 皇后与梦想)
|Album of the Year (Chinese: 年度专辑)
|
|
|-
|Chris Lee
|Female Singer of the Year (Chinese: 年度女歌手)
|
|
|-
|Chris Lee
|Decade of Entertainment Breakthrough Award (Chinese: 娱乐十年音乐飞跃人物)
|
|
|-
|2012
|Chris Lee
|Most Influential Female Singer (Chinese: 年度最具影响力女歌手)
|
|

ERS Chinese Top Ten Awards 
ERS Chinese Top Ten Awards (Chinese: 东方风云榜颁奖典礼) is a music awards show, mostly known for honoring Mandopop music and Mandarin singers based on the radio chart. It was created by Shanghai Media Group Limited in 1993.

!
|-
!scope="row" rowspan="2"|2012
!scope="row" rowspan="2"|Chris Lee
|Best Female Singer (Chinese: 最佳女歌手)
|
|
|-
|All-round Artist (Chinese: 年度全能艺人)
|
|

Global Chinese Music Awards 
Global Chinese Music Awards (Chinese: 全球华语歌曲排行榜颁奖典礼) is a music awards ceremony that features the Global Chinese Pop Chart radio show, established by 7 Asian Mandarin radio stations: HitFm (Taiwan), RTHK (Hong Kong), eastradio (Shanghai), Radio Guangdong, Beijing Music Radio, Y.E.S. 93.3FM (Singapore) and 988 FM (Malaysia) in 2001.
!
|-
!scope="row" rowspan="3"|2006
!scope="row" rowspan="2"|Chris Lee
|Media Recommendation Award (Chinese: 传媒推荐奖)
|
|rowspan="3" style="text-align:center;"|
|-
|Top 5 Most Popular Female Singers (Chinese: 最受欢迎女歌手5强)
|
|-
|Happy Winter (Chinese: 冬天快乐)
|Favorite 20 Hits (Chinese: 二十大最受欢迎金曲)
|
|-
!scope="row" rowspan="3"|2007
!scope="row" rowspan="2"|Chris Lee
|Top 5 Most Popular Female Singers (Chinese: 最受欢迎女歌手5强)
|
|rowspan="3" style="text-align:center;"|
|-
|Media Recommendation Award (Chinese: 传媒推荐奖)
|
|-
|Happy Wake Up
|Favorite 20 Hits (Chinese: 二十大最受欢迎金曲)
|
|-
!scope="row" rowspan="4"|2009
|Why Me
|Favorite 20 Hits (Chinese: 二十大最受欢迎金曲)
|
|rowspan="4" style="text-align:center;"|
|-
!scope="row" rowspan="4"|Chris Lee
|Favorite Female Singer (Chinese: 最受欢迎女歌手)
|
|-
|Top 5 Most Popular Female Singers (Chinese: 最受欢迎女歌手5强)
|
|-
|Best Stage Performance (Chinese: 年度最佳舞台演绎女歌手)
|
|-
!scope="row" rowspan="2"|2010
|Top 5 Most Popular Female Singers (Chinese: 最受欢迎女歌手5强)
|
|
|-
|See You Next Crossing (Chinese: 下个，路口，见)
|Favorite 20 Hits (Chinese: 二十大最受欢迎金曲)
|
|

Global Chinese Golden Chart Awards 
Global Chinese Golden Chart Awards (Chinese: 全球流行音乐金榜颁奖典礼) are an annual music awards ceremony started by China National Radio, which united several Mandarin radio stations all over the world to support Chinese music and create a new music chart radio program—global Chinese music golden chart.
!
|-
!scope="row" rowspan="3"|2010
|Sorry, Just Miss You Suddenly (Chinese: 对不起，只是忽然很想你)
|Top 20 Hits in Mid Year (Chinese: 年中20大金曲)
|
|
|-
|See You Next Crossing (Chinese： 下个，路口，见）
|Top 20 Hits of the Year (Chinese: 年中20大金曲)
|
|
|-
|Chris Lee
|MusicRadio Recommendation Award (Chinese: MusicRadio音乐之声推崇大奖)
|
|
|-
!scope="row" rowspan="2"|2011
|Sorry, Just Miss You Suddenly (Chinese: 对不起，只是忽然很想你)
|Favorite 20 Hits (Chinese: 二十大最受欢迎金曲)
|
|
|-
!scope="row" rowspan="2"|Chris Lee
|Top 5 Most Popular Female Singers (Chinese: 最受欢迎女歌手5强)
|
|
|-
!scope="row" rowspan="2"|2013
|Favorite Female Singer (Chinese: 最受欢迎女歌手)
|
|
|-
|Old If Not Wild (Chinese: 再不疯狂我们就老了)
|Favorite 20 Hits (Chinese: 二十大最受欢迎金曲)
|
|

Golden π Awards 
A voting movie award created by China Mobile for most popular movie, actor, actress, etc. during 2008–2011.

!
|-
|2010
|Chris Lee
|Favorite Actress (Chinese: 最喜爱女演员)
|
|

Hong Kong Film Awards 
The Hong Kong Film Awards, founded in 1982, are a film award in Hong Kong. Award ceremonies are held annually in April. The Awards recognize achievement in all aspects of filmmaking, such as directing, screenwriting, acting and cinematography. Lee has been nominated 2 times for her playing in Bodyguards and Assassins, and twice for film music in 2010 and 2013.

!
|-
!scope="row" rowspan="3"|2010
!scope="row" rowspan="2"|Li Yuchun (Bodyguards And Assassins)
|Best Supporting Actress (Traditional/Chinese: 最佳女配角)
|
|rowspan="3" style="text-align:center;"|
|-
|Best Newcomer (Traditional/Chinese: 最佳新演員/最佳新演员)
|
|-
|Stive (Chinese:粉末)
!scope="row" rowspan="2"|Best Original Film Song (Traditional/Chinese: 最佳原創電影歌曲/最佳原创电影歌曲)
|
|-
|2013
|Cold Blade (Chinese: 刀锋偏冷)
|
|rowspan="1" style="text-align:center;"|

Huading Awards 
The Huading Awards (Chinese: 华鼎奖) were created by Chinese media corporation Tian Xia Ying Cai Media (Chinese: 天下英才传媒) in 2007.

!
|-
|2010
|Bodyguards and Assassins
|Best Newcomer (Chinese: 新锐演员)
|
|rowspan="1" style="text-align:center;"|

Hundred Flowers Awards 

!
|-
|2010
|Bodyguards and Assassins
|Best Newcomer (Chinese: 最佳新演员)
|
|rowspan="1" style="text-align:center;"|

KuGou Music Awards 

!
|-
|2014
|Chris Lee
|Most Focused Artist (Mainland) (Chinese: 年度内地最受关注艺人)
|
|rowspan="3" style="text-align:center;"|

KuMusic Asian Music Awards 

!
|-
|2015
|A Magical Encounter 1987 (Chinese: 1987我不知会遇见你)
|Best Album (Chinese:年度最佳专辑)
|
|

Metro Radio Hits Music Awards 

!
|-
!scope="row" rowspan="3"|2005
!scope="row" rowspan="3"|Chris Lee
|National Popular Singer (Chinese: 勁爆全國人氣歌手/劲爆全国人气歌手)
|
|
|-
|SMASH Best Singer (Online Voted) (Chinese: 勁爆全国投选劲爆歌手/勁爆全国投选劲爆歌手)
|
|
|-
|SMASH Newcomer (Chinese: 勁爆投選勁爆新人王大獎/劲爆投选劲爆新人王大奖)
|
|

MIGU Music Awards 
The MIGU Music Awards (Chinese: 无线音乐盛典咪咕汇) is a music awards show, founded by China Mobile, owned and run by the MIGU and Shanghai Media Group Limited to recognize most popular music and artists based on the MIGU music store's statistics.

!
|-
!scope="row" rowspan="2"|2007
!scope="row" rowspan="2"|Chris Lee
|Special Contribution Award (Chinese: 无线音乐年度贡献奖)
|
|rowspan="2" style="text-align:center;"|
|-
|Most Influential Singer (Chinese: 年度最具影响力歌手)
|
|-
|2008
|Chris Lee (Chinese: 李宇春)
|Best Selling Album (Chinese: 最畅销唱作专辑)
|
|rowspan="1" style="text-align:center;"|
|-
!scope="row" rowspan="2"|2012
|Chris Lee
|Favorite Female Singer (Chinese: 年度最受欢迎女歌手)
|
|
|-
|Sorry, Just Miss You Suddenly (Chinese: 对不起，只是忽然很想你)
|Best Selling Song (Mainland China) (Chinese: 年度最畅销金曲)
|
|

Mnet Asian Music Awards 

!
|-
|2012
|Chris Lee
|Asian Artist Award
|
|

MTV Asia Awards 

!
|-
|2008
|Chris Lee
|Favorite China Act (Chinese: 中国最受欢迎歌手)
|
|

MTV Europe Music Awards 

!
|-
!scope="row" rowspan="2"|2013
!scope="row" rowspan="2"|Chris Lee
|Best Worldwide Act
|
|rowspan="1" style="text-align:center;"|
|-
|Best Mainland China & Hong Kong Act
|
|rowspan="1" style="text-align:center;"|

MTV Style Awards 

!
|-
|2005
!scope="row" rowspan="2"|Chris Lee
|Style New Trends (Chinese: 最具风格演艺圈新势力)
|
|rowspan="1" style="text-align:center;"|
|-
|2011
|Style Female (Mainland) (Chinese: 年度最具风格内地女歌手)
|
|rowspan="1" style="text-align:center;"|

Music King Awards 

!
|-
!scope="row" rowspan="3"|2007
|Raining (Chinese: 下雨)
|Top 10 Hits: Mandarin (Chinese: 十大金曲-国语)
|
|
|-
|Chris Lee
|Mainland Most Popular Female Singer (Chinese: 内地最受欢迎女歌手)
|
|
|-
|Empress and Her Dream (Chinese: 皇后与梦想)
|Music King Media Award (Chinese: 年度最畅销专辑)
|
|

MusicRadio China Top Chart Awards 
MusicRadio China Top Chart Awards (Chinese: MusicRadio中国TOP排行榜颁奖典礼) is an annual Chinese Pop Music awards ceremony, created by China National Radio in 2003.

!
|-
!scope="row" rowspan="3"|2007
|Chris Lee
|Favorite Female Artist (Mainland China) (Chinese: 内地最受欢迎女歌手)
|
|
|-
|The Story of Ice and Chrysanthemum (Chinese: 冰菊物语)
!scope="row" rowspan="2"|Annual Golden Melodies (Chinese: 年度金曲)
|
|
|-
|Floated Subway (Chinese: 漂浮地铁)
|
|
|-
!scope="row" rowspan="2"|2008
!scope="row" rowspan="2"|Chris Lee
|Best Stage Performance Female (Mainland China) (Chinese: 内地年度最佳舞台演绎歌手)
|
|
|-
|Favorite Female Artist (Mainland China) (Chinese: 内地最受欢迎女歌手)
|
|
|-
!scope="row" rowspan="3"|2009
|Teenage China (Chinese: 少年中国)
|Annual Golden Melodies (Chinese: 年度金曲)
|
|
|-
!scope="row" rowspan="2"|Chris Lee
|Favorite Female Artist (Mainland China) (Chinese: 内地最受欢迎女歌手)
|
|
|-
|All-round Artist (Mainland China) (Chinese: 内地年度全能艺人)
|
|
|-
!scope="row" rowspan="2"|2010
|See You Next Crossing (Chinese: 下个，路口，见)
|Annual Golden Melodies (Chinese: 年度金曲)
|
|
|-
|Chris Lee
|Best Female Artist (Mainland China) (Chinese: 年度内地最佳女歌手)
|
|
|-
!scope="row" rowspan="4"|2012
|Sorry, Just Miss You Suddenly (Chinese: 对不起，只是忽然很想你)
|Annual Golden Melodies (Chinese: 年度金曲)
|
|rowspan="3" style="text-align:center;"|
|-
!scope="row" rowspan="2"|Chris Lee
|Favorite Female Artist (Mainland China) (Chinese: 内地最受欢迎女歌手)
|
|-
|Best Crossover Artist (Chinese: 年度最佳跨界艺人)
|
|-
|The Dancing Artist (Chinese: 会跳舞的文艺青年)
|Favorite Album (Mainland China) (Chinese: 年度最受欢迎唱片(内地))
|
|rowspan="1" style="text-align:center;"|
|-
!scope="row" rowspan="9"|2013
!scope="row" rowspan="3"|Chris Lee
|Favorite Female Artist (Mainland China) (Chinese: 内地最受欢迎女歌手)
|
|rowspan="5" style="text-align:center;"|
|-
|All-round Artist (Mainland China) (Chinese: 内地年度全能艺人)
|
|-
|Favorite Female Artist (Mainland China) (Chinese: 内地最受欢迎女歌手)
|
|-
|Chris Lee/Old If Not Wild (Chinese: 再不疯狂我们就老了)
|Best Lyricist (Mainland China) (Chinese: 最佳作词)
|
|-
|Old If Not Wild (Chinese: 再不疯狂我们就老了)
|Annual Golden Melodies (Chinese: 年度金曲)
|
|-
|Chris Lee
|Best Female Artist (Mainland China) (Chinese: 年度内地最佳女歌手)
|
|rowspan="4" style="text-align:center;"|
|-
!scope="row" rowspan="3"|Old If Not Wild (Chinese: 再不疯狂我们就老了)
|Media Recommendation Album (Chinese: 年度传媒推荐唱片大奖)
|
|-
|Favorite Album (Chinese: 年度最受欢迎唱片)
|
|-
|Best Album (Chinese: 年度最佳唱片)
|
|-
|2014
|Chris Lee
|Favorite Female Artist (Mainland China) (Chinese: 内地最受欢迎女歌手)
|
|rowspan="1" style="text-align:center;"|
|-
!scope="row" rowspan="5"|2015
!scope="row" rowspan="2"|Chris Lee
|Favorite Female Artist (Mainland China) (Chinese: 内地最受欢迎女歌手)
|
|rowspan="5" style="text-align:center;"|
|-
|Best Female Artist (Mainland China) (Chinese: 年度内地最佳女歌手)
|
|-
!scope="row" rowspan="3"|A Magical Encounter 1987 (Chinese: 1987我不知会遇见你)
|Favorite Album (Mainland China) (Chinese: 年度最受欢迎唱片(内地))
|
|-
|Best Album (Chinese: 年度最佳唱片)
|
|-
|Best Composing (Mainland China) (年度最佳作词-内地)
|

New Force ·Time of China Ceremony 
Held by Chinese Internet company tencent, the ceremony (Chinese: 新势力·2005时代中国盛典) was set to honor public figures, business brands, internet games, and products (car, mobile phones, computers, cosmetics, etc.)

!
|-
|2005
|Chris Lee
|China Most Popular Web Celebrity (Chinese: 中国最具网络人气明星)
|
|rowspan="1" style="text-align:center;"|

Original Music Awards of Shenzhen 
Originated from the radio program Peng Cheng Ge Fei Yang on Shenzhen Radio Station FM97.1, the awards (Chinese: 鹏城歌飞扬颁奖典礼) were set to encourage Shenzhen original music in 2003.

!
|-
|2011
|I'm Here (Chinese: 我在这里)
|Best 10 Songs
|
|rowspan="1" style="text-align:center;"|

QQ Music Awards 

!
|-
|2015
|Chris Lee
|Favorite Female Artist (Mainland China) (Chinese: 最受欢迎内地女歌手)
|
|rowspan="1" style="text-align:center;"|
|-
!scope="row" rowspan="3"|2016
|Asshole, I Miss You (Chinese: 混蛋,我想你)
|Best International Single (Chinese: 年度最佳国际单曲)
|
|
|-
!scope="row" rowspan="2"|Chris Lee
|Best Crossover Artist (Chinese: 年度最佳跨界艺人)
|
|
|-
|Most Influential Female Singer (Chinese: 年度最具影响力女歌手)
|
|

RTHK Top 10 Gold Songs Awards 
RTHK Top 10 Gold Songs Awards (Chinese: 十大中文金曲頒獎音樂會) is one of the main C-pop music awards in Hong Kong, beginning in 1978. The award is sponsored by RTHK. The ceremony is usually held in January following the end of the previous music season. It usually takes place at the Hong Kong Coliseum, sometimes at the Sha Tin Racecourse.
!
|-
|2009
!scope="row" rowspan="2"|Chris Lee
|National Best Female (Traditional/Chinese: 全國最佳女歌手獎/全国最佳女歌手奖)
|
|
|-
|2010
|National Best Female (Traditional/Chinese: 全國最佳女歌手獎/全国最佳女歌手奖)
|
|

Singapore Hit Awards 

!
|-
|2007
|Chris Lee
|Favorite China Female Act (Chinese: 中国最受欢迎女歌手)
|
|

Sino.com Internet Awards 
Sino.com Internet Awards (Chinese: 新浪网络盛典), held by Chinese, is one of the biggest internet companies, Sino, created in 2003.
!
|-
|2006
!scope="row" rowspan="2"|Chris Lee
|Most Popular New Artist (Chinese: 最具人气新锐偶像)
|
|rowspan="1" style="text-align:center;"|
|-
|2010
|Most Influential Artist (Chinese: 年度最具号召力艺人)
|
|rowspan="1" style="text-align:center;"|

Downloading 2005 · Sohu All Star Ceremony 
A special ceremony (Chinese: 下载2005·搜狐全明星盛典) held by Chinese internet company Sohu in 2006.

!
|-
|2006
|Chris Lee
|Celebrity of the Year (Chinese: 年度明星)
|
|rowspan="1" style="text-align:center;"|

Southeast Music Chart Awards 

!
|-
!scope="row" rowspan="4"|2008
!scope="row" rowspan="3"|Chris Lee
|Best Female (Chinese：年度最佳女歌手)
|
|rowspan="4" style="text-align:center;"|
|-
| Favorite Female (Chinese: 年度最受欢迎女歌手)
|
|-
|SMASH Singer (Chinese: 劲爆最具人气歌手)
|
|-
|Teenage China (Chinese: 少年中国)
|Top Hits (Chinese: 年度金曲)
|
|-
!scope="row" rowspan="3"|2009
|Ame (Chinese： 阿么)
|Top Hits (Chinese: 年度金曲)
|
|rowspan="1" style="text-align:center;"|
|-
!scope="row" rowspan="2"|Chris Lee
|Media Recommendation Most Potential Songwriter (Chinese: 传媒推荐最有潜质创作歌手)
|
|rowspan="2" style="text-align:center;"|
|-
| Favorite Female (Chinese: 年度最受欢迎女歌手)
|

Sprite Music Chart Awards

Seasonal Awards 

!
|-
!scope="row" rowspan="4"|2006
|Give Me Five
|Golden songs (Mainland China) (Chinese: 年度金曲)
|
|rowspan="4" style="text-align:center;"|
|-
!scope="row" rowspan="3"|Chris Lee
|Favorite Female Singer (Mainland China) (Chinese: 内地年度最具人气歌手)
|
|-
|Excellent Performance (Chinese: 优秀表现奖)
|
|-
|Sprite IN Award (Chinese: 雪碧至IN星)
|

Yearly Awards 

!
|-
|2007
|Happy Wake Up
|Golden songs (Mainland China) (Chinese: 内地金曲)
|
|
|-
!scope="row" rowspan="2"|2008
|Raining (Chinese: 下雨)
|Golden songs (Mainland China) (Chinese: 内地金曲)
|
|rowspan="2" style="text-align:center;"|
|-
|Chris Lee
|Best Female Performance (Mainland) (Chinese: 内地最佳演绎女歌手奖)
|
|-
!scope="row" rowspan="3"|2009
|Chris Lee
|Favorite Female Singer (Mainland China) (Chinese: 内地最受欢迎女歌手)
|
|
|-
|Why Me
|Golden songs (Mainland China) (Chinese: 内地金曲)
|
|
|-
|Teenage China (Chinese: 少年中国)
|Best Music Video (Chinese: 年度最优秀视像音乐)
|
|
|-
|2010
|Shu Embroidery (Chinese: 蜀绣)
|Golden songs (Mainland China) (Chinese: 内地金曲)
|
|

Star Awards 
Star Awards (Chinese: 星光大典) is a ceremony held by Tencent co. to honor people in movies, television, and music.

!
|-
|2006
!scope="row" rowspan="2"|Chris Lee
|Favorite Female Singer (Mainland) (Chinese: 内地最受欢迎女歌手)
|
|rowspan="1" style="text-align:center;"|
|-
!scope="row" rowspan="2"|2010
|Female Singer of the Year (Mainland) (Chinese: 内地年度女歌手)
|
|rowspan="2" style="text-align:center;"|

|-
|Bodyguards and Assassins
|Best Newcomer (Mainland) (Chinese: 内地潜力电影新人)
|
|-
!scope="row" rowspan="2"|2012
!scope="row" rowspan="2"|Chris Lee
|Female Singer of the Year (Mainland) (Chinese: 内地年度女歌手)
|
|rowspan="2" style="text-align:center;"|
|-
|Favorite Female Act on Internet (Chinese: 互联网最受欢迎女艺人)
|

TOM Online Honor Award 
TOM Online is one of the biggest Chinese internet corporations of the 2000s. The ceremony (Chinese: “网络·娱乐·英雄会”TOM在线荣耀盛典） was held to honor people who gain particularities and had a huge impact on the internet in 2006-2007.

!
|-
|2006
|Chris Lee
|Most Potential New Artist (Chinese: 最具发展潜力歌手)
|
|rowspan="1" style="text-align:center;"|

Top Chinese Music Awards 
The Top Chinese Music Awards (Chinese: 音乐风云榜年度盛典) is an awards ceremony held annually by Enlight Media since 2001, to honour people in Chinese music.

!
|-
|2006
!scope="row" rowspan="5"|Chris Lee
|Favorite Female Artist (Mainland China) (Chinese: 内地最受欢迎女歌手)
|
|rowspan="1" style="text-align:center;"|
|-
|2007
|Best New Artist (Mainland China)
|
|rowspan="1" style="text-align:center;"|
|-
|2007
|Favorite Female Artist (Mainland China) (Chinese: 内地最受欢迎女歌手)
|
|rowspan="1" style="text-align:center;"|
|-
|2011
|Favorite Female Artist (Chinese: 最受欢迎女歌手)
|
|
|-
|2015
|Favorite Female Artist (Mainland China) (Chinese: 内地最受欢迎女歌手)
|
|

V Chart Awards 

!
|-
|2013
|Young (Chinese: 似火年华)
|Best MV (Chinese: 年度最佳MV)
|
|rowspan="1" style="text-align:center;"|
|- 
|2014
|Chris Lee
|Most Influential Artist of the Year (Chinese: 年度最具影响力艺人)
|
|
|-
|2015
|Cool (Chinese: 酷)
|Best MV (Chinese: 年度最佳MV)
|
|
|-
!scope="row" rowspan="4"|2016
!scope="row" rowspan="4"|Chris Lee
| Most Influential Asian Singer (Chinese: 亚洲最具影响力歌手)
|
|rowspan="4" style="text-align:center;"|
|-
|Best Female Singer (Chinese: 年度最佳女歌手)
|
|-
|YinYueTai Media Recommendation Artist (Chinese: 音悦Tai年度传媒推荐艺人)
|
|-
|Best Stage Performance (Chinese: 年度最具舞台表现)
|

References 

Li Yuchun, awards